Bárbara Gatica (born 16 August 1996) is a Chilean tennis player.

She has career-high WTA rankings of 201 in singles, achieved on 18 July 2022, and 158 in doubles, reached the same week. To date, Gatica has won two singles titles and 18 doubles titles on the ITF Women's Circuit.

Playing for Chile in Fed Cup competition, Gatica has a win–loss record of 17–12 (doubles: 13–4).

In June 2022, Gatica was provisionally suspended from competing, after testing positive for boldenone in April of that year. In December, Gatica was fined $5,000 and banned from professional tennis for three years after she admitted to being paid to deliberately lose a match in 2016.

ITF Circuit finals

Singles: 10 (2 titles, 8 runner–ups)

Doubles: 38 (18 titles, 20 runner–ups)

References

External links
 
 
 

1996 births
Living people
Chilean female tennis players
Doping cases in tennis
Match fixing in tennis
Match fixers
Tennis players from Santiago
20th-century Chilean women
21st-century Chilean women